The Czech Rock is a north summit ridge which is a part of České středohoří in the Liberec Region. It is the most interested touristic part of this 4 kilometres long ridge protruding above the valley of the Šporka stream and it is 629 metres high. This peak is situated 1 km from Prácheň (near Kamenický Šenov) where people usually visit a well-known rock called Panská skála. The west side is not too strong but it falls to the northeast of the valley by steep cliffs formed by columnar basalt.

Flora and fauna 

 From the rocky side of the top there are beautiful but limited views of Prácheň and the surrounding countryside such as Studenec, Nový Bor, Klíč, Hochwald up to Ještěd in Liberec but the views are being slowly overgrown by plants, bushes and trees like lime-trees, oak-trees and pines. In winter bats live inside the rock. Furthermore, there live, for example, dormice, stags, deer, foxes and badgers.

History 

Firstly, the Czech Rock was formerly called Slunečná located on the eastern slope.

 In the 1980s there were punched two short exploratory tunnels in the Czech Rock massive. These tunnels were used to verify a stock of basalt for extraction. One of them is on the northeast edge of rock, directly under the peak and the other is about 80 metres south of the peak. In both cases it is a simple straight corridor without branching and it is a few tens of meters long. Nowadays, it is especially a winter habitat shelter for bats and both tunnels are closed by bars.

Other basalt formations 

In the world there are other similar formations. Firstly,  near the Czech Rock, which is known because of the Czech fairytale called  (The Proud Princess). Secondly, Sheepeater Cliff in Yellowstone is a well-known basalt rock. Thirdly, the Giant's Causeway in Northern Ireland which was declared a World Heritage Site by UNESCO in 1986. Lastly, the Paraná Traps in Brazil is a beautiful place to visit.

References

External links 
 Kroča, J. (2004) “Tajemná místa severních Čech”, Beroun: Nakladatelství MH
 Kühn, J. (1997) Lužické hory http://www.luzicke-hory.cz/mista/index.php?pg=zmcskac (Accessed 17.4.2011)

Mountains and hills of the Czech Republic